Josef Rief (born 13 April 1960) is a German politician of the Christian Democratic Union (CDU) who has been serving as a member of the Bundestag from the state of Baden-Württemberg since 2009.

Political career 
Rief became a member of the Bundestag in the 2009 German federal election. He is a member of the Budget Committee and the Committee for Family, Senior Citizens, Women and Youth. In this capacity, he serves as his parliamentary group's rapporteur on the annual budget of the Federal Ministry of Health.

In addition to his committee assignments, Rief has been a substitute member of the German delegation to the Parliamentary Assembly of the Council of Europe (PACE) since 2018. In this capacity, he serves on the Committee on Social Affairs, Health and Sustainable Development and the Sub-Committee on the European Social Charter.

Political positions 
In June 2017, Rief voted against Germany's introduction of same-sex marriage.

References

External links 

  
 Bundestag biography 

1960 births
Living people
Members of the Bundestag for Baden-Württemberg
Members of the Bundestag 2021–2025
Members of the Bundestag 2017–2021
Members of the Bundestag 2013–2017
Members of the Bundestag 2009–2013
Members of the Bundestag for the Christian Democratic Union of Germany